Periyakilambadi Subburayan Thiruvengadam (17 August 1935 – 14 September 2022) was an Indian politician who served as member of the Tamil Nadu Legislative Assembly on four separate occasions. He was a member of the Dravida Munnetra Kazhagam (DMK), a Dravidian political party in the state of Tamil Nadu.

Thiruvengadam was elected to the Tamil Nadu legislative assembly from Kalasapakkam constituency as a Dravida Munnetra Kazhagam candidate in 1977, 1980, 1989, and 1996 elections. He was latterly a member of DMK Asset Protection Committee. This post was assigned to him by former chief minister of Tamil Nadu M. Karunanidhi.

References 

1935 births
2022 deaths
Dravida Munnetra Kazhagam politicians
Tamil Nadu MLAs 1977–1980
Tamil Nadu MLAs 1980–1984
Tamil Nadu MLAs 1989–1991
Tamil Nadu MLAs 1996–2001
People from Tiruvannamalai district